Jan Cornelis Hofman, alias Jean Hofman, was a Dutch post-impressionist painter, born on April 12, 1889 in Nieuwer-Amstel (the Netherlands), died April 30, 1966 in Schaerbeek - Brussels (Belgium). 
He began as decorator and painter of porcelains in Delft (Netherlands).

His artistic preferences for post-impressionism result in painting Flanders' landscapes, marines, farms' interiors, still lifes and flowers, but very few portraits.
Living in Brussels as from 1913, he was member of the group «L'Effort» and is mainly considered as Belgian artist...

Biography

 First artistic formation at the orphanage in Dieren-Arnhem where he is placed at the age of ten.
 Starts reproducing decorative drawings.
 Spends his free time to roam the neighborhood for better apprehending the landscapes.
 Is an apprentice with a house painter for a while.
 Becomes painter on porcelain, first in Delft, then Makkum.
 Resides in Brussels then in Cologne in 1909.
 Works mainly in the Netherlands until 1913.
 Conscript in spring 1913 but savagely conscientious objector, leaves the Netherlands definitively and settles in Brussels (Belgium) near his sister Anna Alida, who married Frans Buning, childhood friend of the artist whom he knew since the orphanage.
 End of the 1st world war, in 1918, marries Maria Marteau and gives his name to her first child, Jean Leon, born on September 15, 1911.
 On Octobre 3d 1920, birth of his son Victor.
 Moves to Saint-Josse-ten-Noode (Brussels) in 1931.
 In the 30th, becomes regular member of a group of artists and their free workshop «L'Effort».
 1936-1937: Spends nearly two years on the Belgian coast (De Haan, Belgium, Ostend, Koksijde) and devotes himself particularly to his penchant for the marines. Meanwhile, long walks in the surrounding countryside are the pretext for a wide range of subjects of oil paintings captured either in the form of drawings and landscapes as small as 20x30 (which he will reuse as model source until the end of the war and work on more imposing canvas or panels).
 Moves definitively in 1937, Avenue Dailly - Schaerbeek (Brussels), but keeps his workshop, street St. Gudule (opposite the St. Michael and St. Gudula Cathedral), until 1945 year of demolition because of reconstruction work of “The Junction”.
 During the World War II, his family will have to hide from Germans in the workshop to escape from enforced works.
 Then, until his death, works exclusively in his apartment on the basis of drawings made while having good time during various trips and excursions in Flanders and the Netherlands.

His Work
Foremost painter of landscapes, marines, riversides, farms and interiors, still lifes and flowers, he did paint only about thirty portraits.

At the age of 10 years, he was placed in an orphanage in Dieren (Arnhem), after the death of his father.
In this institute he received his first lessons, which consisted of copies of existing drawings, but especially decorative patterns and mural frescos very appreciated in these times.
In 1906, he accepts a job of decorator on porcelain in Delft, then in Makkum, a small town in Friesland (Netherlands). His work then consists in decorating small square plates of  “Delft”, dishes and other objects.

In 1909, after leaving his employment, he begins his life as artist, free and independent.
All his life he will remain faithful to his set of themes for landscapes which will evolve gradually to a greater lightness and will gain in colors and luminosity, always in a post-impressionist style.

In 1928, in Brussels, he organizes an exhibition of his works (the first and only he will ever agree to do) and participates the same year, in Namur, in an overall exposition organized in favour of victims of floods. Photographs of several of his paintings illustrated the newspapers of the time.

In the 30th, he assiduously spends a lot of time in the Circle “L'Effort”, corporation of artists whose workshop was located at Brussels - Grand-Place. In the company of his artist friends, he benefits thus from the services of models and carries out many drawings (charcoals, "sanguines") drawn from life.

After the war, he will reach the top of his art by playing with the sets of shadows and lights throughout his landscape subjects of predilection: fields, undergrowths, farmyards,...
He will thus not be long in gaining a rather great public notoriety and interest from the artistic media, without strictly yielding to their demands and while painting only subjects according to his desires.

He will produce in his lifetime more than 7.500 works, for the majority oils on canvas and generally sizing between (30 X 40) and (50 X 60), made in his workshop, but also a lot of oil works on light panels or cardboards (around 20 X 30), because he preferred those when drawing from life during his excursions.

To live and satisfy his family responsibilities, he was nevertheless obliged to sell works, through art galleries (e.g. Ferbach) which became more and more demanding in front of the increasing interest of customers attracted by the friendliness of his paintings. Also, many of them were sold on the North American market.

The paintings that he agreed to paint thus, which he called “commercial”, represent however nearly 2/3 of his work, often of style in agreement with the image that the public had about him, therefore may be less handled on the level of the artistic study. Such works were generally signed with a surname (e.g.: Mentens) which he separately reserved for each art merchant.

His deep repulsion “to be sold” will lead him to reject any form of exhibition or publicity, except for those organized by the merchants themselves and which he will always refuse to participate personally. This explains the confidentiality of the sale of his works after his death.

Painting was his ideal and guided his all life.

Gallery

References 

 "Deux Siècles de Signatures d'Artistes de Belgique" (Twee Eeuwen Signaturen van Belgische Kunstenaars) by PIRON, P. published by "Editions art in Belgium", 2002.
 Museum of Groningen (Netherlands)
 Museum of Amsterdam (Netherlands)

External links
 Web Site dedicated to the artist
 Arto, Dictionary
 Anthologie des Biographies XIX et XX siècles (only for subscribers)

Sources
 This article is entirely translated from the article Jan Cornelis Hofman on the French Wikipedia.

1889 births
1966 deaths
Post-impressionist painters
Dutch painters
Dutch male painters
Flower artists
Dutch landscape painters
People from Amstelveen
Ceramics decorators